Dale Turner (born 30 January 1974) is an Australian cricketer. He played two first-class matches for New South Wales in 2001/02 and eight List A matches for Queensland between 1999/00 and 2000/01.

See also
 List of New South Wales representative cricketers

References

External links
 

1974 births
Living people
Australian cricketers
New South Wales cricketers
Queensland cricketers
Cricketers from Sydney